Cotton End may refer to:

Places

United Kingdom
Cotton End in Bedfordshire - a small village in south Bedfordshire, England
Cotton End, Northampton - a district of Northampton, England

See also
Coton (disambiguation)